This is a comprehensive list of amphibians of Tasmania. They are all frogs.

Order Anura (frogs and toads)
Crinia nimbus (moss froglet)
Crinia signifera (common eastern froglet)
Crinia tasmaniensis (Tasmanian froglet)
Geocrinia laevis (smooth froglet)
Limnodynastes dumerilii (eastern banjo frog)
Limnodynastes peronii (striped marsh frog)
Limnodynastes tasmaniensis (spotted grass frog)
Litoria ewingii (southern brown tree frog)
Litoria burrowsae (Tasmanian tree frog)
Pseudophryne semimarmorata (southern toadlet)
Ranoidea raniformis (growling grass frog)

References

 
Amphibians of Tasmania
Amphibians
Tasmania